Shohada Rural District is in the Central District of Meybod County, Yazd province, Iran. At the National Census of 2006, its population was 4,034 in 1,077 households. There were 5,581 inhabitants in 1,373 households at the following census of 2011. At the most recent census of 2016, the population of the rural district was 5,059 in 1,380 households. The largest of its 33 villages was Roknabad, with 2,324 people.

References 

Meybod County

Rural Districts of Yazd Province

Populated places in Yazd Province

Populated places in Meybod County